The 1972–73 Indiana Pacers season was Indiana's sixth season in the ABA and sixth as a team. The Pacers finished second in the Western Division and won their third ABA title.
In a rematch of the 1972 division semifinals, the Pacers eliminated the Denver Rockets. After defeating the Rockets in five games, the Pacers eliminated the Utah Stars in six games. The Eastern Division champion Kentucky Colonels appeared in the ABA Championships for the second time and were defeated by the Pacers in seven games.

Offseason

ABA Draft

Regular season

Schedule

Season standings

Player stats
Note: GP= Games played; MIN= Minutes; REB= Rebounds; AST= Assists; STL = Steals; BLK = Blocks; PTS = Points; AVG = Average

Roster

Playoffs
Western Division Semifinals

Western Division Finals

ABA Finals

Awards, records, and honors
 George McGinnis, appeared in the 1973 ABA All-Star Game
 Mel Daniels, appeared in the 1973 ABA All-Star Game

Transactions

References

 Pacers on Basketball Reference

External links
 RememberTheABA.com 1972–73 regular season and playoff results

Indiana
American Basketball Association championship seasons
Indiana Pacers seasons
Indiana Pacers
Indiana Pacers